This is a list of national capitals, including capitals of territories and dependencies, non-sovereign states including associated states and entities whose sovereignty is disputed.

The capitals included on this list are those associated with states or territories listed by the international standard ISO 3166-1, or that are included in the list of states with limited recognition.

Sovereign states and observer states within the United Nations are shown in bold text.

List

Notes

References

Capitals, National
Alphabetical